José Geraldo da Cruz A.A. (8 August 1941 – 4 April 2022) was a Brazilian Roman Catholic prelate.

Da Cruz was born in Brazil and was ordained to the priesthood in 1969. He served as bishop of the Roman Catholic Diocese of Juazeiro, Brazil, from 2003 until his retirement in 2016.

References

1941 births
2022 deaths
Roman Catholic bishops of Juazeiro
21st-century Roman Catholic bishops in Brazil
Augustinian bishops